Duplex! is a children's music band from Vancouver, British Columbia, Canada that claims influences from urban folk to punk rock. The members range in birth years from 1967 to 2002; both toddler Abe Caruso and noted Canadian musician Veda Hille played on the debut album.

History
Duplex! formed in 2005 in Vancouver, as part of a recording project organized by Veda Hille. The adult members were Annie Wilkinson, Justin Kellam, Sierra Terhoch, Matt Caruso, Shaun Brodie  and Veda Hille.  The band also included teenager Saoirse Soley and toddler Abe Caruso.  They and released their debut album, Ablum, through Mint Records, the same year.  Some of the songs were written by children.

The band's second album, Worser, was released in 2009 in Mint Records.

See also

Music of Canada
Canadian rock
List of Canadian musicians
List of bands from Canada
:Category:Canadian musical groups

References

External links

Official site
Mint Records Duplex! biography

Musical groups established in 2005
Child musical groups
Canadian children's musical groups
Musical groups from Vancouver
Mint Records artists
2005 establishments in British Columbia